Nicholas, Neco, Nico or Nick Williams may refer to:

Sportsmen
Nick Williams (fullback) (born 1977), American NFL football player, a/k/a Nick Luchey
Nick Williams (rugby union) (born 1983), New Zealand rugby league and rugby union player
Nick Williams (defensive lineman) (born 1990), American NFL football player
Nick Williams (wide receiver) (born 1990), American NFL football player
Nick Williams (baseball) (born 1993), American outfielder
Neco Williams (born 2001), Welsh footballer
Nico Williams (born 2002), Spanish footballer

Writers
Nick Boddie Williams (1906–1992), American newspaper editor and author, a/k/a Nick B. Williams
Nicholas Williams (poet) (born 1942), English writer in Cornish, a/k/a N. J. A. Williams
Nicholas Sims-Williams (born 1949), English scholar of Central Asian history
Nicholas Duncan-Williams (born 1957), Ghanaian religious leader and author 
Nick Williams (academic), English professor of enterprise at Leeds since 2015

Others
Sir Nicholas Williams, 1st Baronet (1681–1745), British Member of Parliament
Nicholas Charles Williams (born 1961), English painter and draughtsman

See also
Williams (surname)